Tangbao or soup buns are a large, soup-filled type of steamed buns (baozi) in Chinese cuisine. They are also sometimes known as guantang bao or soup-filled buns. Various varieties are found, with some name variations in various parts of the country. All of these buns are made by wrapping a gelatinous filling in dough, which is then steamed to melt the filling into soup.

Types
Some examples of tangbao include:
 Tangbao from Kaifeng, in Henan province: The traditional tang bao in Kaifeng is a large bun, similar to other baozi, which is bitten open to release the soup filling, which is then drunk with a spoon. However, the traditional form has all but disappeared, with most eateries choosing to serve a Jiangsu-style tangbao where the soup is drunk with a straw.
 Tangbao from Yangzhou, Jingjiang and elsewhere in Jiangsu province: This variety is found throughout the Jiangnan region. Often served in its own individual steaming basket, the large steamed bun contains a soup filling made with pork gelatin and sometimes, crab roe. The soup is drunk with a straw, the rest of the bun eaten afterwards. It is often served with ginger slices and vinegar.
 Xiaolongbao from Shanghai and elsewhere in Jiangsu province: a small sized variety of tangbao usually made with unleavened dough, each bun is picked up and bitten open to access the pork and soup filling.
 Xiaolong tangbao from Wuhan: similar to a xiaolongbao in shape, but made with leavened dough.

See also
 Xiaolongbao
 Wonton
 List of steamed foods

References

Dim sum
Jiangsu cuisine
Shanghai cuisine
Steamed foods
Street food